The governor of Eastern Samar is the local chief executive and head of the Provincial Government of Eastern Samar in the Philippines. Along with the governors of Biliran, Leyte, Northern Samar, Samar, and Southern Leyte, the province's chief executive is a member of the Regional Development Council of the Eastern Visayas Region.

List of governors of Eastern Samar

References

Governors of provinces of the Philippines